Douglaseraie des Farges is a  French state-owned forest of ten hectares located in Meymac, Corrèze.

Douglaseraie des Farges was planted in 1895 with Pseudotsuga menziesii (Coast Douglas-fir). These trees can reach heights of up to 50 metres (164 ft.) and a canopy volume up to 15 m³ (530 ft³). They have measured ten trees; the highest ones were 56 m (184 ft.) with a diameter of 1.04 m (3.4 ft.):
circumference from 3.7 m (12 ft.) to 3.79 m (12.5 ft.).
diameter from 0.97 m (3.1 ft.)  to 1.17 m (3.8 ft.).
height from 43.4 m (142.4 ft.)  to 56.80 m (186.3 ft.).

External links
https://web.archive.org/web/20091008140815/http://www.meymac.fr/meymac-la-douglaseraie-des-farges_94.html

Forests of France
Geography of Corrèze
Tourist attractions in Corrèze